Whirlwind (roller coaster) may also refer to:

 Bocaraca, a former roller coaster at Knoebels Amusement Resort, once called "Whirlwind"
 The Whirlwind roller coaster at the defunct Olentangy Park